Raghavan Seetharaman (born 1959) is a former CEO of Doha Bank (DSM:DHBK). He resigned in March 2022 after 15 years as CEO. Set up in 1978, Doha Bank is one of the largest commercial banks in Qatar. In 2015, business magazine Forbes ranked Seetharaman 6th in the Forbes’ Top Indian Leaders in the Arab World.

Early life
Seetharaman was born and raised in India. He is a Chartered Accountant and holds certificate in IT systems and Corporate Management, whilst being a gold medallist in his graduation Bachelor of Commerce from University of Madras.

Career
Seetharaman started his career at PricewaterhouseCoopers (PwC), one of the four largest professional services networks. In 2002, he became deputy CEO for Doha Bank. Seetharaman was named CEO in September 2007. Since then, he has overseen the bank's expansion from its base in Qatar to the UAE, India, Singapore and China, among others.

Honours
Seetharaman has received honorary doctorates from:

 European University 
 Sri Sri University 
 Washington College
 European University Foundation - Campus Europae 
 Arts, Sciences and Technology University in Lebanon
 Sri Sharada Institute of Indian Management (SRISIIM)

References

External links
 Personal website

Indian bankers
Living people
University of Madras alumni
Businesspeople of Indian descent
1959 births
Recipients of Pravasi Bharatiya Samman